Eddie Long may refer to:

Eddie Long (1907–1958), Welsh international rugby player
Eddie Long (1933–?), Canadian ice hockey player
Eddie Long (1953–2017), American megachurch pastor